Cokeville may refer to:
Cokeville, Pennsylvania, a community in Westmoreland County, Pennsylvania
Cokeville, Wyoming, a community in Lincoln County, Wyoming